Birger Magnusson may refer to:

 Birger jarl (or Birger Magnusson of Bjälbo) (1210 – 1266), founder of Stockholm
 Birger, King of Sweden (1280 – 1321), King of Sweden

sv:Birger Magnusson (olika betydelser)